The Medal "For Impeccable Service" was a Soviet military award for long service awarded to deserving members of the military personnel of the armed forces of the USSR, of the Interior Ministry of the USSR and of the Ministry for the Protection of Public Order of the USSR, to recognise ten, fifteen and twenty years of faithful and impeccable service to the state.

Medal history 
Prior to the establishment of the Medal "For Impeccable Service", existing state Orders meant for feats of valour or for extraordinary services to the state were conferred to military personnel for long service.  An Order of Lenin for twenty-five years of service, the Order of the Red Banner for twenty, the Order of the Red Star for fifteen, hundreds of thousands of such awards seriously devaluated the awards of the same Orders earned for their original criteria.  The intent to encourage the establishment of a ministerial/departmental level medal "For Impeccable Service" was stated in decree of the Presidium of the Supreme Soviet of the USSR of September 14, 1957 emphasising the then devaluation of certain Soviet high military Orders used as long service awards instead of their originally intended criteria.  This led to the joint January 25, 1958 decree of the Ministers of Defence, of Internal Affairs and of the Chairman of the Committee on State Security of the USSR establishing the Medal "For Impeccable Service".

Medal statute 
The Medal "For Impeccable Service" was established in three classes.  The first class was awarded for twenty years of excellent service, the second class for fifteen and the third class for ten.  They were awarded sequentially from the third class to the first class to members of the military personnel of the Ministry of Defence of the USSR, of the Ministry of Internal Affairs of the USSR and to members of the Ministry for the Protection of Public Order.

The Medal "For Impeccable Service" was worn on the left side of the chest and in the presence of other awards of the USSR, was located after them in sequential order from the first to the third class.  If worn in the presence of Orders or medals of the Russian Federation, the latter have precedence.

Medal description 
The Medal "For Impeccable Service" was a 32-millimetre-diameter circular medal with a raised rim on both the obverse and reverse.  On the obverse at center, the relief outline of a large five-pointed star with the hammer and sickle at its center, between the arms, rays radiating at an obtuse angle forming a point.  Along the circumference of the medal, passing between the raised rim and the points of the star, a laurel wreath.  This design was common to all three services bestowing it, Defence, Interior and the KGB, the only exception being the second variant of the medal bestowed by the KGB, which bore the Roman numerals "XX", "XV" or "X" in the lower part of the obverse, between the lower rays of the star.

On the reverse of the Defence Ministry medal, the circular relief inscription along the upper medal circumference, "ARMED FORCES", at the bottom, the inscription "USSR".  In the center, the relief inscription on four lines "FOR (10, 15 or 20) YEARS OF IMPECCABLE SERVICE" over a small five pointed star.

On the reverse of the Interior Ministry medal, at the top, a small relief five-pointed star, at the bottom, the inscription "MVD USSR".  In the center, the relief inscription on three lines "FOR (10, 15 or 20) YEARS OF IMPECCABLE SERVICE".

On the reverse of the Ministry for the Protection of Public Order medal, at the top, a small relief five-pointed star, at the bottom, the inscription "MOOP".  In the center, the relief inscription on three lines "FOR (10, 15 or 20) YEARS OF IMPECCABLE SERVICE".

The first-class medal was initially struck from silver; after 1965 it was constructed of silver-plated brass.  The central star on its obverse was enamelled in red.  The second-class medal from its inception was also constructed from silver-plated brass, with the exception of the central star on its obverse (which was left bare). The third-class medal was always struck from solid brass.

There are other lower reverse inscriptions from multiple variants of various Soviet republics, these are a sample of the many, MVD of the Belarus SSR, MVD of the Ukrainian SSR, MVD of Kazakhstan, Ministry for the Protection of Public Order of the Russian SFSR, Ministry for the Protection of Public Order of the Belarus SSR, Ministry for the Protection of Public Order of the Georgian SSR.

The Medal "For Impeccable Service" was secured by a ring through the medal suspension loop to a standard Soviet pentagonal mount covered by a 24-millimetre-wide red silk moiré ribbon with 2-millimetre-wide green edge stripes.  The ribbon for the medal 1st class had a single 2-millimetre-wide central yellow stripe; the ribbon for the medal 2nd class and two 2-millimetre-wide central yellow stripes 2 mm apart; the ribbon for the medal 3rd class had three 2-millimetre-wide central yellow stripes 2 mm apart.

Recipients (partial list)

The individuals below were all recipients of the Medal "For Impeccable Service".

Colonel Yuri Alekseyevich Gagarin
Major Pavel Ivanovich Belyayev
Major General Vladimir Sergeyevich Ilyushin
Lieutenant General Ruslan Sultanovich Aushev
Marshal of the Soviet Union Sergey Fyodorovich Akhromeyev
MVD Army General Rashid Gumarovich Nurgaliyev
Admiral Vladimir Grigor'evich Yegorov
Colonel General Gennady Nikolayevich Troshev
Lieutenant General Vladimir Anatolyevich Shamanov
Army General Viktor Germanovich Kazantsev
Marshal of the Soviet Union Nikolai Vasilyevich Ogarkov
Marshal of the Soviet Union Sergei Leonidovich Sokolov
Major General Timur Avtandilovich Apakidze
Colonel General Boris Vsevolodovich Gromov
Admiral of the Fleet Vladimir Ivanovich Kuroyedov
Army General Mukhtar Altynbayev
Colonel General Nikolay Nikolayevich Bordyuzha
Colonel General Alexander Nikolayevich Zelin
Colonel Vladimir Vasilievich Kvachkov
MVD Army General Anatoly Sergeevich Kulikov
Army General Anatoly Mikhaïlovich Kornukov
Colonel General Arkady Viktotovich Bakhin
Vladimir Nesterov, Director of the Khrunichev State Research and Production Space Center
Colonel General Mikhail Ivanovich Barsukov
Colonel Ivan Fedorovich Ladyga
Army General Sagadat Kozhahmetovich Nurmagambetov
Major General Igor Dmitrievich Sergun
Lieutenant Colonel Anatoly Vyacheslavovich Lebed
Brigadier General Victor Gaiciuc

See also 
Orders, decorations, and medals of the Soviet Union
Badges and Decorations of the Soviet Union
Red Army
Soviet Navy
MVD
KGB

References

External links 
 Legal Library of the USSR

Military awards and decorations of the Soviet Union
1958 establishments in the Soviet Union
Awards established in 1958
Long service medals